Vistula is an unincorporated community in York Township, Elkhart County, Indiana.

History
Vistula was laid out in 1865. It was likely named after the Vistula River.

Geography

References

External links 
 Elkhart County Historical Society

Unincorporated communities in Elkhart County, Indiana
Unincorporated communities in Indiana